Catherine Stermann (18 September 1949 – 11 April 1985) was a French actress.

Early life
She was granddaughter of the German Politician .

Career

For some of her roles, she used the names and pseudonyms Catherine Melo, Ophélie Stermann and Claude Stermann.

Death
Aged 35, she ended her own life at her apartment.

Theatre

Filmography

Bibliography

 Michel Stermann, My Maman Grete – An educator from Germany for orphans of Holocaust victims in France, TwentySix, 2018 .

References

External links
 
 
 
 
 

1949 births
1985 deaths
20th-century French actresses
French actresses
1985 suicides
Suicides in France